Marcus Cetius Faventinus was a Roman author on architecture active in the late 3rd or early 4th century AD. He wrote a handbook based mainly on earlier authors, especially Vitruvius. It was intended mainly for private builders. Its original title was Artis architectonicae privatis usibus adbreviatus liber ('abridged book of the art of architecture for private uses'), but is now more commonly known as De diversis fabricis architectonicae. It was used by the agricultural writer Palladius and by the encyclopaedist Isidore of Seville. It was also known by Sidonius Apollinaris. There is a modern English translation with a facing Latin edition.

Notes

Bibliography

3rd-century Romans
4th-century Romans
3rd-century architects
3rd-century Latin writers
Architectural theoreticians
Classical antiquarian architecture writers